Tampines Rovers Football Club is a professional football club based in Tampines, Singapore, that competes in the Singapore Premier League, the top tier of Singapore football league system. Founded in 1945, the club have won the national league championship eight times, the Singapore Cup three times, the Singapore Premier League five times and the ASEAN Club Championship once. The Stags are known for boosting a considerably high attendance at home and away games.

Tampines Rovers is one of the wealthiest football clubs in Singapore. It is also one of the more widely supported football clubs in Singapore, attracting high attendances at both home and away games. Its main rival is Geylang International, with whom they contest in the Eastern Derby.

History
Several football enthusiasts from Tampines decided to form a football club in 1945. After many name changes, they finally decided on "Tampines Rovers" as the official club name. The Stags spent the 1950s and 1960s competing in the Singapore Amateur Football Association League, where they were among the top teams, until they were placed in Division II of the newly formed National Football League in 1974. 1975 was a watershed year for Tampines, as they were promoted to Division I after winning all their league matches and reached the President's Cup final, where they lost 0–1 to the Singapore Armed Forces Sports Association in front of a national record crowd of 30,000. They continued to challenge for honours for the next decade, reaching another President's Cup final in 1978, then emerging as national champions in 1979, 1980 and 1984. The Stags were relegated to the second tier in 1988, but under a new management team, won their league in 1994, and were one of eight clubs selected to compete in the newly formed S.League.

However, Tampines did not finish higher than sixth place in the first six seasons of the S.League. In 2002, the Stags secured the services of Malaysian coach Chow Kwai Lam, who guided them to the Singapore Cup and two fourth-place finishes. Under the next coach, Vorawan Chitavanich, Tampines achieved the S.League and Singapore Cup double in 2004. The following season, they successfully defended their S.League title, were named the 'S.League Team of the Decade' and became the first Singapore team to win the ASEAN Club Championship. The Stags were Singapore Cup champions in 2006, but finished runners-up to SAFFC in the S.League. The Stags was also the champion of S-League in 2011 and 2012. They were also runner-up in the 2012 Singapore Cup after losing 1–2 to SAFFC.

2016 season

Signing 9 Lions XII players, Tampines Rovers FC began with 6 unbeaten matches in the S.League. In February Tampines Rovers FC started with the 2016 AFC Cup. Tampines Rovers FC finished second place in Group E with 10 points. Leaving the Red Giants behind with 2 points' difference. The round of 16 was won with 10 men by Tampines Rovers FC versus Mohun Bagan by a late goal in the after extra time 1–2. This was also V. Sundramoorthy's last match before taking on the Singapore national football team job as care taker. V. Sundramoorthy's successor was his Assistant coach Akbar Nawas. He was appointed to be the next head coach of Tampines Rovers FC followed with 8 straight wins and 28 goals. Tampines Rovers FC started the 2016 RHB Singapore Cup with a double win playing Global in the quarterfinals. Global had an unbeaten score in the whole of 2016 season. The Stags will face their AFC Cup rivals Ceres from their group stage were they draw and lost a match and let them finish 1st in the AFC Cup 2016 group E.

2017 season

In view of the financial woes faced by the club during the 2016 season, drastic measures were taken before the start of 2017 season. These would include cut in players and technical staff's salaries, shutting down of fruit machines to name a few. Club chairman, Mr Krishna Ramachandra had decided to make sweeping changes within the club to avoid the same issues happening as last season. The 3 foreign imports from last season, Billy Mehmet, Jordan Webb and Jermaine Pennant had been released from the club with them joining Brunei DPMM, Warriors FC and Bury FC respectively. The club had also ended their 15-year association with their long term sponsor, Hyundai. A significant number of the playing staffs had also left the club as well, notably Hafiz Abu Sujad who left the club for Thai Division 2 side, BBCU F.C.

The club had signed a trio of foreign young players to replace the 3 that had departed the end of last season. They would include former Ceres FC utility player, Son Yong Chan, Japanese Teenage winger, Ryutaro Megumi and former Croatia U17 International, Ivan Jakov Džoni. They too did sign a couple of local free agents last season. Notable local signings would include Singapore National Team Defensive Pairing, Madhu Mohana and Daniel Bennett from Warriors FC and Geylang International FC. The most notable one would be the sudden resignation of coach Akbar Nawas who left the club just 1 month before the start of the season and was replaced by former Garena Young Lions Coach, Jürgen Raab.

They took on Global FC in the AFC Champions League Play-offs this season and lost to them 2–0, which meant that they would be playing in the AFC Cup this season where they finished as quarter finalists last season.

Midway through the season, club chairman, Mr Krishna Ramachandra had announced that he would be stepping down as chairman of the club. Citing commitment issues as the reason. He stayed on as club chairman to assist in FAS in the auditing and settling the accounts of the club prior to the date of his official step down (22 August 2017). On 30 August 2017, Mr Desmond Ong had been confirmed by FAS as the new chairman of the club and had also appointed a totally brand new committee for the club moving forward.

2018 season

The 2018 season marked the beginning of the Singapore Premier League era. The club started their 2018 season with an AFC Champions League Play-offs against Bali United. To ensure the job security of the players, Tampines Rovers started the initiative to offer longer term contracts to their players. They have 3 models of contracts for their players. The first kind of contract is that the players would be able to get a set increment at the end of every year. Second kind of contract (mainly for the U23 players) is that there would be a year-end review at the end of the season to decide on the amount of increment. The last kind of contract is that their salary would be the same for the duration of the contract. Most of their players are securing a 2-3-year deal with the club.

Despite agreeing to a 3-year deal, the club has allowed midfielder, Shahdan Sulaiman, to go on a season-long loan to Melaka United, in view of long-term benefits for both clubs and the player. Some of the national players in the club had also moved on to play in overseas leagues as well. Thus the club had signed quality replacements to fill in the shoes for the players who had departed the club for other clubs. The club had also retained the services of Japanese midfielder, Ryutaro Megumi for the 2018 season. They had also brought back Canadian winger, Jordan Webb from Warriors FC to fill up the foreign quota of the team. The club has also signed quite a number of young players (mainly from the National U20 Squad and Tampines Rovers Prime League) to fill up the minimum quota of U23 players needed in the team for the new season.

The club has signed a 2-year technical sponsorship deal with Danish Sportswear Company, Hummel in a deal worth S$100,000 per season. They would be providing the club with their Home, Away, Third Jerseys, as well as the training and team wear. They would not be having any main jersey sponsor in this upcoming season as the management had decided that the word "Hormat" (Respect in Malay) would be emblazoned across the chest for the upcoming season. They had debuted their new home jersey during the AFC Champions League Play-off against Bali United. The away and third kit would be revealed in Feb 2018. The club would be facing Johor Darul Ta'zim, Persija Jakarta, Sông Lam Nghệ An in the AFC Cup 2018 after failing to advance from the Asian Champions League 2018 Play-off game. Their first game would be on 10 February 2018 against Sông Lam Nghệ An.

The club has also announced partnership with local private football academy JSSL Singapore. JSSL would look into the development of youth players from Under-6 to Under-14 age categories. The best players from the U6 to U14 categories would than be fast tracked to the stags U16 and U19 teams in the club's Center of Excellence and ultimately the first team. JSSL Singapore's general manager, Gavin Lee has also been assisting Head Coach, Jurgen Raab in the first team matters as Assistant Coach.

2019 season

The team had made a slew of changes to both the team coaching set up and as well as the playing staff this off season. In view of the undesirable results from the previous season, head coach Jurgen Raab was relieved from his coaching duties. There was an overhaul of the technical team as Khadir Yahaya was roped in as head coach. While last year's assistant coach, Gavin Lee was promoted to First-team coach while he completes his AFC "A" Coaching License. former club captain Mustafić Fahrudin stayed on with the club after his retirement to be the assistant coach of the team. Former player Isa Halim was brought in to be the fitness coach, together with goalkeeper coach William Phang forms the new technical team.  The team had also signed a number of young players to the team from the National Football Academy, they had also signed 2 new Serbian U-21 players, Zehrudin Mehmedović and Mirza Delimedjac. At the same time the team had also signed goalkeeper, Zufairuuz Rudy from Hougang United. Shahdan Sulaiman had also returned from his loan stint in Melaka United. As backup goalkeeper Haikal Hasnol was loaned to Home United due to National Service Commitments. Irfan Fandi had also been loaned to Young Lions due to National Service Commitments as well. Notable players such as Hafiz Sujad, Afiq Yunos and Fazrul Nawaz had moved to Hougang United. At the same time Mustafic Fahrudin had also retired from the game and is now working as an assistant coach in the team.

In pre-season the team had taken on NFL Side SCC before traveling to Thailand to participate in the LEO Cup. After coming back from Thailand, they took on Katong FC before facing JDT II and Albirex Niigata Singapore. Notably in their final friendly game against Albirex Niigata Singapore, they beat Albirex Niigata Singapore 4-0. In the attendance of a healthy crowd watching the friendly game. It was also announced that Hyundai has returned to be the main sponsor of the club since not partnering with the club from 2017. ANA Courier Express, Gatorade has continued their partnership with the club as well.  has also come on board as well. Hummel had also released the club's new jersey and the jersey had been specially designed and made for the club.

Their first official game of the season would be a trip to Yangon, Myanmar to take on Yangon United in the AFC Cup. A game in which they came from behind to beat Yangon United 3-1 after trailing at the end of the first half. Thanks to goals from Khairul Amri, Zehrudin Mehmedovic and Ryutaro Megumi. They would kick start their campaign in the AIA Singapore Premier League on 3 March 2019 against Hougang United at the Jalan Besar Stadium. After a streak of impressive wins, the team had a slight dip of form drawing the next 4 games, winning 2 and losing 2. At the same time top striker, Khairul Amri had left Tampines Rovers to sign for Felda United in the Malaysia Super League.

This 2019 season, 
the Centre of Excellence Tampines Rovers FC U-18 team led by Head COE Coach Afiq Yahya were crowned CHAMPIONS for the FAS COE U-18 League. Competing with all FAS Club youth teams in Singapore. Besides winning the COE U-18 League, The u18s finished 3rd place for FAS Challenge cup also known as the Youth COE FA cup.

2020 season

The 2020 season marked 75 years since the club's founding. The club kicks off its 2020 campaign against Bali United in an AFC Champions League play off on 14 January 2020. The game ended in a thrilling 5-3, with Bali United winning the tie with 2 goals in extra-time. This meant that Tampines Rovers FC would play in the  AFC Cup instead ending up in Group H of the competition.
The team started magnificently, winning 3 out of their 3 opening fixtures without conceding a goal and scoring 7 along the way, putting 4 past recently acquired Lion City Sailors. The AFC Cup was no different, winning 2 and drawing 1 of their 3 games. However, due to the Covid-19 outbreak, the league was halted from 27 March. 

The Ministry of Culture, Community and Youth approved the season recommencement on 17 October. Competition rule changes included the provision for two water breaks during a match, and clubs will be able to use up to five substitutions (in defined windows after half-time). In addition only 11 more matches per team were to be played over 49 days. With the season ending on the 5th of December.
Tampines began their return with their first loss of the season to Hougang United. However they recovered with a superb win over favourites Albirex Niigata. They went on to finish the season unbeaten in their next 9 games but ultimately finished 2nd, 3 points off Albirex Niigata at top spot. It was their draws at Geylang, Balestier and Hougang that cost them. However, they qualified for the AFC champions league due to Albirex Niigata’s inability to qualify for Continental competitions as they were a satellite team of Albirex Niigata of Japan.

Sponsors

Crest and colours
The club selected the stag as its animal mascot as the animal is a symbol of wisdom, its antlers are associated with the tree of life and in Chinese culture, it is a symbol of virility. The club's colours are predominantly yellow for its Home kit, with a mixture of black, blue and white for its away colours.

Stadium
The Stags initially played their home games at the Tampines Stadium. In 2011, the stadium was demolished to build an integrated community and lifestyle building Our Tampines Hub (OTH) which includes a football stadium. During the construction of OTH, the Stags used Clementi Stadium as their homeground from 2012 to 2014 and then Jurong West Stadium from 2015 till the first half of 2017.

In 2017, the Stags moved back to OTH, utilising OTH's Town Square, which has a seating capacity of 5,000, to play their home games. On 28 July 2017, Tampines Rovers had their first match at their newly-opened stadium against Brunei DPMM FC and won 2–0. That match saw a crowd of 4,676 fans. 

In 2019, in view of the shared stadium initiative by Football Association Singapore, Geylang International will share OTH as their home ground. It caused a lot of unrest within the local football community, stating that without its spiritual home, the clubs are losing its identity.

Supporters 
The Yellow Brigade was the very first unofficial supporters group for Tampines Rovers FC formed in 2012. The bulk of the group were mostly members of the LATW (Lions All The Way) Crew. They were a group of staunch supporters who had come out with a lot of initiatives to improve fans experience in the old Tampines Stadium during match days. They had also came out with their own version of fans' scarf and a lot of off the field initiatives to bring fans, the community and the team closer together.

The Yellow Knights is the second unofficial supporters group for the club, formed in 2019. The group are mostly fans who had been following the club for quite a while. They too, the same as The Yellow Brigade, do want to do their best to improve the fans experience in Our Tampines Hub. At the same time to serve as an informal feedback channel to the club management. They did too bring back some of the initiative in the past like Fans' Player of the Month. They are strong advocate of youth football supporting not just the first team but the youth teams whenever they can. At the same time they do as well recognize ex-stags in every way they possibly can in an attempt to bring the whole stag family together as 1 big family which includes the fans, stakeholders, club management, club technical staff, players and ex-players.

Since the move back to OTH, the average attendance per match is approximately 2000 fans which is the highest in the league.

Players

Squad

U23
U23

U23
U23

U21

U21
U21
U21
U21
U21
U21
U21
U21
U21
U21
U21
U21
U21
U21
U21
U21
U21
U21
U21
U21
U21

On Loan

 (NS till 2024)
 (NS till 2025, to Young Lions FC)
 (NS till 2025, to Young Lions FC)
 (NS till 2025, to Young Lions FC)
 (NS till 2025, to Young Lions FC)

Club officials

Management
 Chairman: Desmond Ong
 Vice Chairman: Lee Lung Nien
 Honorary Secretary: Nicholas Hunter
 Honorary Treasurer: Ian Lau
 Committee Member: Nicholas Narayanan, Leong Wing Kong

Reference:

Technical staff
 General Manager: William Phang
 Head coach: Gavin Lee
 Assistant coach: Fahrudin Mustafić
 Goalkeeper coach: William Phang
Video analyst: Ng Wei Xian
 Sports Trainer: Chong Wei Zhi
 Fitness coach: Tan Guo Xiong
 Physiotherapist: Trevor Lee
 Physiotherapist: V. Surendran
 Logistics Officer: Goh Koon Hiang

Reference:

Honours

Domestic
League
 S.League: 5
 2004, 2005, 2011, 2012, 2013
 National Football League Division One: 3
 1979, 1980, 1984

Cups
 Singapore Cup: 4
 2002, 2004, 2006, 2019
 Singapore Charity Shield: 5 (record)
 2011, 2012, 2013, 2014, 2020
 Singapore League Cup:
 Plate Winners: 2014

Continental
 ASEAN Club Championship: 1
 2005

AFC Club Ranking

References

External links
 Official club website
 S.League website page on Tampines Rovers FC

 
Football clubs in Singapore
Association football clubs established in 1945
Tampines
1945 establishments in Singapore
Singapore Premier League clubs